Central Police Station may refer to:

77 North Front Street, former Central Police Station of Columbus, Ohio
Central Police Station (Hong Kong)
Central Police Station (St. Joseph, Missouri)
Central Police Station, Bristol
Central Police Station, Tampere
Sydney Central Police Station

See also
Steelhouse Lane police station, Birmingham, England